Joshua Cohen may refer to:

Joshua Lionel Cowen (1877–1965), born Cohen, American inventor
Yehoshua Cohen (1922–1986), Israeli assassin
Joshua Cohen (philosopher) (born 1951), American philosopher
Joshua J. Cohen (born 1973), mayor of Annapolis, Maryland
Joshua Cohen (writer) (born 1980), American writer 
Josh Cohen (tennis) (born 1984), American tennis player, head coach of Philadelphia Freedoms
Josh Cohen (soccer) (born 1992), American soccer player